Events in the year 2019 in Liberia.

Incumbents 

 President: George Weah
 Vice President: Jewel Taylor
 Chief Justice: Francis S. Korkpor, Sr.

Events
 February 15 – Bong County Superintendent Esther Walker is suspended by President Weah.
 February 18 – President Weah, on February 15, declared this day a national day of mourning due to the deaths of over 40 people in a mudslide at an illegal mining operation in Gbanipea in Nimba County.
 May 20 – Former President Ellen Johnson Sirleaf is appointed by World Health Organization Director General Tedros Adhanom Ghebreyesus as Goodwill Ambassador for the health workforce.
 June 7 – The Weah administration blocks a number of social media websites in response to anti-government protests against high inflation rates and corruption.
 June 20
The National Peace Hut Women of Liberia win the 2019 United Nations Population Award.
First Lady Clar Weah launches the 'She's You' movement.
 July 26 – Nobel Peace Laureate Leymah Gbowee serves as the national Independence Day orator.
 July 29 – The Montserrado County senatorial election is conducted. Abraham Darius Dillon, backed by four opposition parties, defeats ruling party candidate Paulita C. C. Wie.
 August 30 – President Weah and Japanese Prime Minister Shinzo Abe hold a summit meeting.
 September 18 – At least 27 people, mostly children, killed by a fire in an Islamic boarding school in Paynesville.
 November 16 – Bucky Raw wins Artist of the Year at the 2019 MTN Liberia Music Awards.

Deaths
 March 25 – Adolph Lawrence, Member of the House of Representatives (2012–2019), in motor accident (b. 1969)
 July 4 – Christopher Minikon, ambassador and politician, in Rockville, Maryland, U. S. (b. 1933)
 November 10 – Charles Brumskine, President Pro Tempore of the Senate (1997–1999), (b. 1951)

References 

 
2010s in Liberia
Years of the 21st century in Liberia
Liberia
Liberia